Andersonville is an  unincorporated community in Posey Township in the northwest corner of Franklin County, Indiana, United States.

History
On October 17, 1820 the government granted 160 acres to John and Simeon Barber/Barbour.  Andersonville, the original town known as Ceylon, was laid out in Oct 1831 by Simeon Barber in 1831. It was 78 lots. The original streets (in use today) were laid out 66 feet wide and alleys were  feet wide. The Anderson Addition was laid out by Joel (Joseph) Anderson and  Fletcher Tevis in 1837 with additional lots and streets. Anderson P.O. was established. The two additions merged and it was renamed in 1849 after Thomas Anderson, a tavern owner. In 1915, Andersonville had about 350 inhabitants.

Geography
It lies at the intersection of U.S. Route 52 and the east end of Indiana State Road 244; this forms an acute angle, and the named streets run north and south in the triangle thus formed.

Notes

References
 United States Board on Geographic Names (GNIS)

Unincorporated communities in Franklin County, Indiana
Unincorporated communities in Indiana